Morir para vivir (English title: Die to live) is a Mexican telenovela produced by Ana Martín for Televisa in 1989.

Claudia Ramírez and Eduardo Capetillo starred as protagonists, while Susana Dosamantes starred as main antagonist.

Plot 
Rosaura Guzmán is a woman whose evil knows no limits. Years ago, she sent to prison her own sister, Mercedes, accusing her of a crime she did not commit, so that she could stay with her husband, Andrés Guzmán, with whom Rosaura was in love. Alicia, the little daughter of Mercedes and Andrés, grew up thinking that Rosaura was her real mother, while she was serving her sentence in prison.

Fifteen years later, Rosaura's love for Andrés has ended and she is now the lover of the engineer Federico Iturralde, who was hired by Andrés himself to do drilling work on the hacienda where they live. Andrés begins to suspect that his wife is unfaithful to him with Iturralde, so Rosaura goes to ask for help from Bocó, the most famous sorcerer in the region. He gives her a poison that she pours little by little into Andrés's drinks until he causes a catatonic state very similar to death. Everyone, including Alicia, believes Andrés dead, who is buried alive

Rosaura prepares to celebrate her triumph without suspecting that Alicia and Federico have fallen in love, but when she finds out, she decides to eliminate her stepdaughter just as with her husband. Alicia is about to be buried alive when Teo, her dear old nurse, discovers a tear slipping down her cheek. The nurse asks for help from Dr. Sebastián Quijano (whom Andrés had asked to take care of Alicia in case he died), but then Bocó appears to try to prevent her from saving the young woman. During the struggle between the two men, Bocó loses his life when hitting his head, so the doctor decides to replace Alicia's body with the corpse of the witcher. The next day, the burial is carried out without Rosaura or anyone else knowing what happened. Meanwhile, the doctor takes Alicia to her home in Mexico City, where the young woman slowly recovers from what happened.

In front of Don Sebastián's house is a guest house owned by Milagros, a cheerful and kind woman who cares for her tenants as if they were part of her family. Alicia does not suspect that one of the guests is her real mother, Mercedes, who has been teaching piano since she was released from prison. Fate leads Alicia to become his student; over time, between the two women a great mutual love is born without any suspicion of the relationship that unites them

Víctor also lives in Milagros' house, a boy who has come from Guadalajara to the capital with the intention of becoming a great musician. Alicia's kindness makes Victor fall in love with her; However, Alicia does not want to know anything about love after what she experienced with Federico. Her heart is still filled with resentment and there is only one thing that drives her to continue living: the desire to take revenge on her father's murderer and the man who broke her heart. This time, it is Alicia who is not willing to stop at anything or anyone.

Cast 
 
Claudia Ramírez as Alicia Guzmán/Andrea Quijano Guzmán
Eduardo Capetillo as Víctor
Susana Dosamantes as Rosaura Guzmán de Iturralde
Raúl Román as Federico Iturralde
Otto Sirgo as Sebastián Quijano
Carlos Bracho as Andrés Guzmán
Anna Silvetti as Mercedes Guzmán
Silvia Mariscal as Elena
Leonorilda Ochoa as Milagros
Erik Rubin as Armando
Rafael Rojas 
Rosita Pelayo as Rosi
Carlos Espejel as Gus
Eugenio Cobo as Pedro
Óscar Morelli  
Miguel Gómez Checa as Genaro
Jorge Abraham as Vicente
Bruno Bichir as Julio
Héctor del Puerto as Jorge
Mario García González as Florentino
Julia Marichal as Teo
Adriana Olivera  as Carolina
Roxana Saucedo as Norma
Jorge Zepeda as Bocó
Claudia Fernández as Lorena
Queta Carrasco as Aurora
Rosa Carmina as Mireya
Maleni Morales 
Álvaro Guerrero  
Mónica Miguel 
Lilia Aragón as Greta
Lorena Velázquez as Etelvina
Roberto Hernández as Chinto
Verónica Langer as Martha
José Ángel García as Roberto
Beatriz Monroy as Eufemia
Montserrat Ontiveros as Estrella
Laura Zaizaras as Vicky
Sara Campos as Luz
Eduardo Castell as Dr. Herrera
María Cristina Michaus as Gitana
Francisco Javier Jiménez as Sacerdote
Norma Rodríguez as Lupe
Luis de Llano Macedo as Luis de la Pradera
Sergio Ramos «El Comanche» as El Pérfido
José Luis Rodrigo as Francisco

Awards

References

External links

1989 telenovelas
Mexican telenovelas
1989 Mexican television series debuts
1989 Mexican television series endings
Spanish-language telenovelas
Television shows set in Mexico City
Televisa telenovelas